Chengannur Diocese is one of the 30 dioceses of Malankara Orthodox Syrian Church. Its headquarters is situated at Bethel Aramana, Chengannur

History
The Diocese of Chengannur was established on 10 March 1985 with 50 Churches from Thumpamon, Niranam and Kollam Dioceses. It spreads out in Alappuzha and Pathanamthitta districts having 51 churches and 10 chapels

.H.G. Dr Thomas Mar Athanasios Kizhakkethalakkal became the first Metropolitan of the Diocese of Chengannur on 1 August 1985 .

In 2018 the then Malankara Metropolitan H.H Baselios Marthoma Paulose 2 appointed H.G Dr. Mathews Mar Thimotheos as the assistant metropolitan of the diocese to help Mar Athanasios in his old age . In 2018 August, Mar Athanasios died .

The diocese came directly under the control of the then Malankara Metropolitan H.H. Baselios Marthoma Paulose who was assisted by H.G.Dr.Mathews Mar Thimotheos. In 2021, H.H Baselios Marthoma Paulose died and H.H. Baselios Marthoma Mathews was enthroned as the Malankara Metropolitan and he became the metropolitan of Chengannur.

In 2022, H.G Dr Mathews Mr Thimotheos became the Metropolitan of the diocese of Chengannur.

Diocesan Metropolitan

Diocesan Metropolitans

1)H.G Dr.Thomas Mar Athanasios Kizhakkethalakkal (1985-2018)

2)H.H Baselios Marthoma Paulose II (2018-2021)

3)H.H Baselios Marthoma Mathews III (2021-2022)

4) H.G Dr Mathews Mar Thimotheos (current)

Assistant Metropolitans

1)H.G Dr Mathews Mar Thimotheos (2018-2022)

Parish List
1) Ala St.George Orthodox Church

2) Arathil St.George Orthodox Maha Edavaka

3) Arattupuzha St.Marys Orthodox Church

4) Attuva St.Bursouma Orthodox Church

5) Bhudannor St.Elias Orthodox Church

6) Chengannur Bethel Mar Gregorios Orthodox Aramanapali

7) Chengannur St.Ignatious Orthodox Cathedral

8) Cherianad St.George Orthodox Church

9) Edanad St.Marys Orthodox Church

10) Edavankad St.Marys Orthodox Church

11) Kadamankulam St.Marys Orthodox Church

12) Kallunkal East St.Ignatious Orthodox Church

13) Kallunkal West St.George Orthodox Church

14) Karakkad Seenaikkunnu St.Marys

15) Kodukulanji St.Marys Orthodox Church

16) Koorthamala St.Marys Orthodox Church

17) Kudassanad St.Stephens Orthodox Church

18) Kurampala St.Thomas Orthodox Church

19) Kurichimuttom St.Stephens Orthodox Church

20) Kuttamperror St.Marys Orthodox Church

21) Kuttor Betaniya Mar Gregorios Orthodox Church

22) Mangalam St.George Orthodox Church

23) Manthalir St.Thomas Orthodox Church

24) Maramon Marthamariam Pazya suriyani Orthodox Pali

25) Mezhuveli Holy Innocent Orthodox Church

26) Mezhuveli Shalem Orthodox Church

27) Mulakkuzha St.Marys Orthodox Church

28) Neervilakam Mar Gregorios Orthodox Church

29) Nellickal St.Marys Orthodox Church

30) Nellimala Mar Gregorios Orthodox Church

31) Nooranad St.Thomas Orthodox Church

32) Olickal Mar Gregorios Orthodox Church

33) Othera St.Marys Orthodox Church

34) Pandanad North St.Thomas Orthodox Church

35) Pandanad St.Marys Orthodox Church

36) Perissery East Mar Gregorios Orthodox Church

37) Perissery St.Marys Orthodox Valiyapali

38) Piralaseery St.George Orthodox Church

39) Poozhikad St.George Orthodox Church

40) Puliyoor St.Marys and St.George Orthodox Church

41) Pullad St.George Orthodox Church

42) Puthencavu St.Marys Orthodox Cathedral

43) Thiruvanvandoor St.George Orthodox Church

44) Thottapuzha Mar Gregorios Orthodox Church

45) Ullannor St.George Orthodox Church

46) Ullannor St.Marys Orthodox Church

47) Umayattukara St.Thomas Orthodox Church

48) Vallamkullam St.Marys Orthodox Church

49) Venmony St.Marys Orthodox Church

50) Yordanpuram Mar Gregorios Peniel Orthodox Church

51) Kozhuvallor St.George Orthodox Church-UDC

References

External links
 
Website of Malankara Orthodox Church

Malankara Orthodox Syrian Church dioceses
1985 establishments in Kerala